The Cheltenham Township School District is a public school district serving Cheltenham Township in Montgomery County, Pennsylvania. The District is one of the 500 public school districts of Pennsylvania. According to 2000 federal census data, it served a resident population of 36,875. By 2010, the District's population declined to 36,000 people. In 2009, the district residents’ per capita income was $31,424, while the median family income was $76,792. In the Commonwealth, the median family income was $49,501  and the United States median family income was $49,445, in 2010. By 2013, the median household income in the United States rose to $52,100.

Schools 
The district operates seven schools.

Cheltenham Elementary (K-4th) - Serves Cheltenham Village
Wyncote Elementary (K-4th) - Serves Wyncote, and parts of Elkins Park
Glenside Elementary (K-4th) - Serves Glenside
Myers Elementary (K-4th) - Serves Melrose Park and La Mott
Elkins Park Middle School (5th-6th) - Serves all communities
Cedarbrook Middle School (7th-8th) - Serves all communities
Cheltenham High School (9th-12th) - Serves all communities

References

External links 
 Cheltenham Township School District
 Independent Podcast Site of Cheltenham Township School Board Meetings

School districts in Montgomery County, Pennsylvania
Cheltenham Township, Pennsylvania